Ebony Drysdale - Daley (born 21 January 1995) is a Jamaican judoka who competes in the women's -70 kg class.

Personal life
Based in Britain with dual British and Jamaican heritage. Both her fathers parents and her mothers parents were born in Jamaica. Her father was also born in Jamaica St Thomas. She used to compete for Great Britain and won a junior world silver medal in 2014. She’s been representing Jamaica since 2019. Her brother Nicholi has also competed in Judo for Jamaica. She studied at the University of Wolverhampton.

Career
She competed at the 2019 Commonwealth Games Judo Championships,  2019 World Judo Championships, and 2020 Panamerican Senior Championships.

She qualified for the 2020 Summer Olympics, becoming her country’s first-ever competitor in the sport to qualify for the Olympic Games. She competed in the women's 70 kg event.

References

External links
 
 

1994 births
Living people
Jamaican female judoka
Olympic judoka of Jamaica
Judoka at the 2020 Summer Olympics
Pan American Games competitors for Jamaica
Judoka at the 2019 Pan American Games
British female judoka
British sportspeople of Jamaican descent
Black British sportspeople
Judoka at the 2022 Commonwealth Games
Commonwealth Games silver medallists for Jamaica
Commonwealth Games medallists in judo
Medallists at the 2022 Commonwealth Games